Causa holosericea is a species of air-breathing land snail, a terrestrial pulmonate gastropod mollusk in the family Helicidae.

Distribution 
The distribution of this species is Alpine.
 Czech Republic
 Poland 
 Slovakia
 Italy
 Germany
 France
 Austria	
 Croatia	
 Liechtenstein	
 Slovenia

Shell description

References

External links 
 AnimalBase info

Helicidae
Gastropods described in 1791